McElroy Creek is a stream in the U.S. states of Iowa and Missouri. It is a tributary of High Creek.

McElroy Creek has the name of A. McElroy, a pioneer judge of Atchison County, Missouri.

See also
List of rivers of Iowa
List of rivers of Missouri

References

Rivers of Fremont County, Iowa
Rivers of Atchison County, Missouri
Rivers of Iowa
Rivers of Missouri